Tuma or Tůma is a personal name and surname derived from Thomas. It can refer to:

Places
Bab Tuma (Saint Thomas's Gate), borough of Damascus
Tuma-La Dalia, municipality in the Matagalpa department of Nicaragua
Tuma (Arnarvon Islands), a minor island in the Arnarvon Islands
Tuma, Russia, name of several inhabited localities in Russia

People
Adolf Tuma (born 1956), Austrian painter
Bohdan Tůma (born 1967), Czech actor and voice actor
 František Tůma (1704–1774), Czech composer
Hama Tuma (born 1950), Ethiopian poet
 Jaroslav Tůma (born 1956), Czech organist
 Martin Tůma (born 1985), Czech ice hockey player
Romeu Tuma (1931–2010), Brazilian politician
Scott Tuma, American musician
 Stanislav Tůma (born 1948), Czech wrestler
 Zdeněk Tůma (born 1960), Czech economist

Other
Tuma MTE 224 VA, Swiss machine pistol
Millettia peguensis or Tuma, a legume tree species
Tuma, a fictional character in the Bionicle universe
Tuma or Toma, different varieties of cheese in Italy.